Johann Loetz Witwe (also known as Joh. Loetz Witwe and Joh. Lötz Witwe) was an important art glass manufacturer in Klostermühle, Bohemia, Austria-Hungary. Johann Loetz's works are among the most outstanding examples of Art Nouveau

History

In the Wottawattal of the Bohemian Forest was one of the oldest glass works, which was bought in 1850 by Johann Lötz, the founder of the company, and former owner of glass factories in Deffernik, Hurkental, Annatal and Vogelsang.

In 1879 Max Ritter von Spaun, a grandson of Johann Lötz, took over the factory from his grandmother and continued to run it under the old company name, "Joh. Lötz Witwe".  The factory had previously been equipped with a significant grinding shop.  It was here that heavily cut crystal and cut-through enameled flashing glass were manufactured.  The company started to produce the colored glass in the 1860s.

Lötz'sche glass has always been a specialty because of its purity and fiery colors, and was initially purchased as raw glass by North Bohemian refineries, who refined the same through painting and grinding.  Later, due to the high regard of the glass, the company started production of specialty luxury items.  The company was the first to manufacture the so-called baroque glass—objects with applied glass decorations—in Austria.  Sample warehouses were located in Vienna, Berlin, Hamburg, Paris, London, Brussels, Milan, and Madrid, which soon gave the products a worldwide reputation.

The glass artfully imitated all types of Onyx, Jasper, Carnelian, Malachite, Lapis, Inlaid glass, etc.  The luxury glasses that emerged from the factory received the highest awards.  In the anniversary exhibition in 1888, the "Kaiser Franz Josefs Vase", designed by Hofrat Storck and produced by the Lötz company in Grauonyx, was unveiled.  It was the largest vase that had been blown from glass until then.  Most of the world exhibitions were loaded with special products from the company and were given the highest awards, including the Prix de Progrès and Honorary Diploma Brussels 1888; and the Grand Prix Paris 1889; as well as honorary diplomas from Vienna, Munich, Antwerp, Chicago, and San Francisco.

Max Ritter von Spaun had received several awards for his services to the glass industry.  In 1883 he received the high distinction of being allowed to carry the title kk priv. Glasfabrik and the imperial eagle in the shield and seal.  He was also recognized in 1889 by the award of the Knight's Cross of the Order of Franz Josef; the Belgian Order of Leopold; and the Order of the French Legion of Honor.

Eduard Prochaska, with the company since 1880, served as director.  The sons and grandsons of the workers employed in Joh. Lötz's glassworks were the tribe of the factory staff, a testament to the good understanding between the employer and the worker.

Similar to the glasses from Louis Comfort Tiffany, Loetz was able to produce colored glasses with high level of metallic iridescence.  The company had contacts with other manufacturers such as J. & L. Lobmeyr and E. Bakalowits Söhne in Vienna and with the Argentor plants.  Well-known artists with whom he worked were Josef Hoffmann, Koloman Moser, and the Wiener Werkstätte.  The peak of the cooperation happened after 1900.  The company was represented and won awards at the Paris World's Fair, and in the Chicago and St. Louis fairs.

The outbreak of the First World War and the collapse of the monarchy brought difficult times for the company. The Second World War and the expulsion of the German-speaking population of Czechoslovakia, and thus a large part of the employees, meant the complete end of the company.

Literature

References

External links

Loetz Glass
Loetz Museum

Art Nouveau works
Glassmaking companies
Design companies established in 1850